Michael Tierney, better known as Mick Pyro, is an Irish musician. He is best known as the frontman of the Dublin funk rock band Republic of Loose. He has also participated in other independent work with fellow Irish and international musicians and performed a duet with Sinéad O'Connor at the 2008 Meteor Awards where she revealed her admiration for his vocals. He has also written for the Irish Independent. Pyro is known for his distinctive singing and his bearded appearance.

Education and influences 
Pyro has an MA in Renaissance literature and is an avid reader. He is known for his diverse musical tastes involving hip hop, soul and blues, with almost every record he purchases being hip hop. He has described hip hop as "one of the most innovative art-forms around and it's constantly capable of shocking and surprising me". Cee-Lo Green's 2004 album Cee-Lo Green... Is the Soul Machine is one of Pyro's personal favourites but he also likes Biz Markie, EPMD, Big Daddy Kane and 1980s soul and funk such as Alexander O'Neal and Rick James – one of his heroes. He also likes metal bands such as Children of Bodom and listens to blues and jazz such as Howlin' Wolf, John Lee Hooker, Mahalia Jackson and soul singers such as Al Green and Solomon Burke. Pyro credited a former American friend with a great taste in music for becoming a Buddhist monk and leaving behind approximately 300 CDs of Coltrane, Mingus and Miles Davis. He likes the music of Bob Dylan, describing his 1997 Time Out of Mind album as having a "spooky" production and "savage" lyrics. On Michael Jackson, he once said "You feel a bit creepy listening to him and you have to be in the right mood but there's a really sad lament in his voice". After Jackson's death, Pyro dubbed him "the best singer who ever sang on record".

Style 
Pyro is known for his excessive stage antics, with The Irish Times describing him as having "cajoled, provoked, teased, screamed, shouted, stomped and flirted away" through an entire set with Republic of Loose, whilst the Irish Independent has compared him to "an insane rock version of Robbie Williams, with the voice of a young and drunk James Brown". The Daily Telegraph once described him as "a bizarre mixture of Otis Redding, Screaming Jay Hawkins and an Irish drunk at closing time." John Meagher, writing in the Irish Independent, described Pyro as "the focal and vocal point of Republic of Loose" who "works his stage like a Joshua Tree-era Bono" During Republic of Loose's 2008 residency at the Dublin Academy, Pyro's stage presence was described by Ed Power in the Irish Independent as "more wedding-dance flap than Harlem shuffle, but he carries his shtick off with so much charisma you find yourself applauding instead of guffawing". His battles with alcoholism are chronicled in the song "Poquito" which features on the Republic of Loose album Vol IV: Johnny Pyro and the Dance of Evil and he also wrote the song "Comeback Girl" whilst drunk. Nowadays, his performances are not alcohol-related.

Pyro has also attracted comments for his dress sense, with Eoin Butler of The Irish Times once pondering if Republic of Loose release singles to demonstrate the number of pink sports jackets the singer owns, the answer of which is, according to Butler, "surprisingly many". Larissa Nolan noted his Miami Vice-style suit in her Irish Independent review of Republic of Loose's performance at Oxegen 2006. He is also noted for his "legendary lack of timekeeping" which often renders him late for interviews.

Career 

Mick Pyro performed with self-described "rubbish rock bands" for several years before the formation of Republic of Loose. Experiencing what he termed "a huge metaphysical overturning of my value system", Pyro developed a fascination with musicians such as James Brown and The Rolling Stones, or "the stuff your Dad likes". This change of musical interest prompted him to create Johnny Pyro, an alter-ego, who, according to Pyro, "disassociated himself from the normal lifestyle of an Irish bourgeois kid". This alter-ego later developed into Republic of Loose. With this band, Pyro has performed at numerous music festivals, including Glastonbury Festival and Reading and Leeds Festivals in England. However the band sell most of their records in Ireland, where they have been regulars on the festival circuit for many years.

In 2008, Pyro was part of a collaboration of Irish and international musicians who combined to celebrate the life of Ronnie Drew by recording "The Ballad of Ronnie Drew" at Windmill Lane Studios in Dublin. During this recording he met Sinéad O'Connor, and she was so impressed with his vocals on the track that she asked him if they could perform a duet. O'Connor combined with Republic of Loose to perform a cover of the Curtis Mayfield song "We People Who Are Darker Than Blue" during the Meteor Music Awards which were held at Dublin's RDS on 15 February 2007.

On 16 March 2009, Pyro appeared at Vicar Street, Dublin for Unoccupied Minds, described as a "night of theatre, poetry, songs and music", a fund-raising event hosted by the Irish Anti-War Movement, which also featured Christy Moore, Stephen Rea, Sinéad Cusack, Róisín Elsafy, Judith Mok and Joyce.

As of late 2011, Pyro has a Monday night residency in 'The Leeson Lounge', Leeson Street, Dublin playing the Blues with Pat O'Farrell, James Delaney, John Querney and Noel Bridgeman.

Personal life 
Pyro's sister, Annie, from Tieranniesaur and Yeh Deadlies was previously in a band called Chicks. He helped write songs for Chicks. She was also a member of the indie band The Radio. Pyro lives in the basement pad of a 1960s Swedish-style house in residential Dublin suburb of Terenure. His passions include CDs, books and films. Pyro has spoken in the past about his battles with alcoholism.

References 

Irish male singer-songwriters
Year of birth missing (living people)
Living people